The 2018 Bolton Metropolitan Borough Council election took place on 3 May 2018 to elect members of Bolton Council in Greater Manchester, England. This was on the same day as other local elections. The Labour Party retained overall control of the Council with a majority of 1.

21 seats were contested and the Conservative Party won 9 seats, the Labour Party won 8 seats, the Liberal Democrats won 2 seats, and Farnworth and Kearsley First won 2 seats.

After the election, the total composition of the council was as follows:
Labour 31
Conservative 19
UK Independence Party 3
Liberal Democrats 4
Farnworth and Kearsley First 3

Election results

Council Composition
Prior to the election the composition of the council was:

After the election the composition of the council was:

LD - Liberal Democrats
U - UKIP
FK - Farnworth and Kearsley First

Ward results

Astley Bridge ward

Bradshaw ward

Breightmet ward

Bromley Cross ward

Crompton ward

Farnworth ward

Great Lever ward

Halliwell ward

Harper Green ward

Heaton and Lostock ward

Horwich and Blackrod ward

Horwich North East ward

Hulton ward

Kearsley ward

Little Lever and Darcy Lever ward

Rumworth ward

Smithills ward

Tonge with The Haulgh ward

Westhoughton North and Chew Moor ward

Westhoughton South ward

References

2018 English local elections
2018
2010s in Greater Manchester